Stenosphenus maccartyi is a species of beetle in the family Cerambycidae. It was described by Giesbert and Chemsak in 1989.

References

Elaphidiini
Beetles described in 1989